Hernán Gutiérrez (born 11 November 1964) is a Colombian boxer. He competed in the men's lightweight event at the 1984 Summer Olympics.

References

1964 births
Living people
Colombian male boxers
Olympic boxers of Colombia
Boxers at the 1984 Summer Olympics
Place of birth missing (living people)
Lightweight boxers